Tytthoscincus batupanggah, also known as the cursed-stone diminutive leaf-litter skink, is a species of skink. It is endemic to Borneo and only known from its type locality Gunung Penrissen in Sarawak, East Malaysia.

It is a leaf litter specialist.

References

batupanggah
Endemic fauna of Borneo
Endemic fauna of Malaysia
Reptiles of Malaysia
Reptiles described in 2016
Taxa named by Aaron M. Bauer
Taxa named by Indraneil Das
Taxa named by Benjamin R. Karin
Reptiles of Borneo